The Tagansko-Krasnopresnenskaya line (formerly Zhdanovsko-Krasnopresnenskaya (Line 7) is the busiest line of the Moscow Metro. Built in 1966–1975 and extended in 2013–15, it cuts Moscow on a northwest-southeast axis and contains 23 stations.

History
Tagansko-Krasnopresnenskaya line is a classic example of Soviet urban planning, sometimes referred to as the seventh stage of the Metro. Construction began in the early 1960s, and in 1966 the first complete segment was opened. In the practice of Moscow radial line openings, it began at the ring and left through to the new housing massifs on the southeast of Moscow, originally called the Zhdanovskaya line (Ждановская линия). The construction of the new radius was designed to maximize the efficiency of it with the land-based transportation. All the stations were built on major transport links and the stations Tekstilschiki and Vykhino were integrated into a single transport complex with the railroad stations.

The path began at the Taganka Square (on the ring) and followed the Marxist street/Volgograd avenue through the neighbourhoods of Pechatniki, Kuzminki and Tekstilshchiki. On its final stretch, the line deviates from the Volgograd avenue and crosses onto the Ryazan avenue and terminates at a combined cross-platform transfer to the railways at Vykhino.

Although the geology of the line was unfavourable, so to cut down costs, the builders adopted a cut-and-cover method for tunnel construction building them out of large concrete boxes. In some cases, like the second stretch of the Volgogrdsky Prospekt-Tekstilshchiki path, in a rare occurrence for Moscow, the track goes on the surface, as with the approach to Vykhino.

In a similar logic that was shown when building the Kaluzhsko-Rizhskaya line, it was decided to postpone the central section in favour of building the new radial line, however after the opening of the new Zhdanovskaya line in late 1966, the passenger traffic between it and the former Kaluzhskaya line overstretched the capacity of the ring between Oktyabrskaya and Taganskaya. The two presented itself a unique opportunity and in late 1970 Moscow Metro's first cross-platform transfer point was opened at Kitay-Gorod.

Construction of the Krasnopresnensky radius was in built in much more difficult conditions, in a similar fashion it was designed to make the new massifs of the northwestern Moscow accessible, however the more dense regions, underground fortifications and communication lines that the builders had to face, the first stage of the Krasnopresnensky radius knows no equals in the number of difficulties that the builders were faced with. Beginning at the ring, where the only deep level station was located, the line follows the Krasnaya Presnya street and then turns north along the 1905 year street, further work was hampered by the necessity to cross under the sorting yard of the Belorussky Rail Terminal with a total of 27 individual railroads, and when building the last stretch Polezhayevskaya-Oktyabrskoye Pole. In both cases, the soil was typical sand that was used to elevate the railways, which made it impossible to bore under using conventional means. Firstly chemical adhesive had to be used to strengthen it so that when drained, it would not fall in. To avoid a collapse after the shield bored its way, a horizontal platform had to be installed above it, and the TBM moved at maximum pressure, without any temporary joining in the sand. Just like the Zhdanovskaya line, the line relieved major transport arteries and congestion, Begovaya was built similarly to Tekstilshchiki with exists from subways coming straight onto railway platforms.

As four of the five stations were sub-surface, an attempt was made to modernise the existing centipede design. The volume of the station space was increased, and to support the larger roof, the size of the pillars was raised, but so was their spacing, from 4 to 6.5 metres. In the end, instead of the two rows of 40, there was 2 of 26. The new design became very widespread in the rest of the system. The architecture also made a comeback with new stations. For the first time in nearly 20 years, marble was used on station walls.

Building the final part of the line commenced shortly afterwards on the central stretch finally linking up the Zhdanovskaya line, and finishing the Krasnopresnensky radius. The former was built with two deep level column stations, one of the centrepieces was the increased diameter of the central vault of 9.5 metres, as well as the rich architecture methods used. The latter section encountered a significant difficulty when building under the Moscow Canal. To avoid flooding, boring had to be done in the winter, and a three-metre thick plane of ice had to be placed on the canal bed. Afterwards, the line continued into the northern regions of Shchukino and Tushino, including another combined railway link at Tushinskaya. The station Skhodnenskaya was another pioneering design, which consisted of a single vault technology initially developed for the Kharkiv Metro, it too became common elsewhere in the Soviet Union. Another station on this stretch was left unfinished because of the lack of need for it and remained derelict for thirty years. The station was completed and inaugurated in August 2014 under the name Spartak.

Because the line is the busiest on the system, there are significant problems that overstretch its capabilities. In particular is the station Vykhino, which was built with too small a capacity to handle the congestion, making it the busiest on the system. In 2004 a severe reconstruction increased the area of the platforms and gave the station a desirable facelift. Nonetheless, that was insufficient to solve the problem, and in 2013 the line was extended to the south-eastern districts of Moscow outside the Ring Road with the opening of Zhulebino and Lermontovsky Prospekt stations. By September 2015, the line has reached a neighboring city of Kotelniki with the construction of an eponymous metro station there. The Kotelniki station opened on 21 September 2015 and became the new terminus of the southeastern radius.

Timeline

Name changes

Stations

Rolling stock
The line is served by two depots, Planernoe (№ 6) and Vykhino (№ 11).  Respectively 36 and 34 eight carriage trains are assigned to them.  Most of the trains are Ezh3 and Em-508T models which were received new from 1974, currently all of the trains were modernized between 2003 and 2011 extending the service life by another 15 years. From 2012 to 2017, the line was also served by 10 81-717/714 trains, which were transferred here from other lines. As of 2019 the line is only served by Ezh and 81-765/766/767 trains.

Subway car types used on the line over the years:

Recent developments and future plans

Southern radius 
After the opening of the Kotelniki station, there are no further development plans extending beyond 2020 horizon.

Northern radius 
Extension of Arbatsko-Pokrovskaya line (Line 3) allowed easier access to the Metro system to the passengers from Strogino and Mitino districts, diverting them from the northern stretch of the Tagansko-Krasnopresnenskaya line. However, this relief was not very significant, mostly due to Arbatsko-Pokrovskaya line being relatively slow. It takes 30 minutes to reach the Koltsevaya line from Mitino station, while the older Tushinskaya-Barrikadnaya route takes 20. In addition, it does not offer convenient transfers to Kaluzhsko-Rizhskaya line and Kalininskaya line, as the old route does. Another source of congestion to the northern terminus station, Planernaya, is the newly developed Kurkino district, which lies nearby just beyond the Moscow Ring Road. Additionally, passengers from Khimki diverted to this station due to redevelopment of the Rechnoy Vokzal area that caused changes in the bus routes. An extension is proposed from the Planernaya to the Kurkino district.

References

External links

Station photos on the Robert Schwandl's UrbanRail site
Line gallery on the Urban Electric Transit

Moscow Metro lines
 
Railway lines opened in 1966